Rockhampton is a city in Queensland, Australia.

Rockhampton may also refer to related topics:
 Rockhampton City, Queensland, the central suburb of Rockhampton, Queensland
 Rockhampton Region, the local government area surrounding Rockhampton, Queensland
 Rockhampton Morning Bulletin, newspaper published in Rockhampton, Queensland
 Rockhampton Airport, an airport serving Rockhampton, Queensland
 Rockhampton Correctional Centre, a prison near Rockhampton, Queensland
 City of Rockhampton, a former local government area in Queensland
 Town of North Rockhampton, a former local government area in Queensland
 Electoral district of Rockhampton, Queensland, Australia
 Electoral district of Rockhampton North, Queensland, Australia
 Electoral district of Rockhampton South, Queensland, Australia
 Anglican Diocese of Rockhampton, Queensland
 Roman Catholic Diocese of Rockhampton, Queensland
 West Rockhampton, Queensland, a suburb of Rockhampton, Queensland

Alternatively, it may refer to:
 Rockhampton, Gloucestershire, a village in South Gloucestershire, England